Carl Edward Byrum (born June 29, 1963) is a former American football running back who played three seasons with the Buffalo Bills of the National Football League (NFL). He was drafted by the Bills in the fifth round of the 1986 NFL Draft. He played college football at Mississippi Valley State University and attended Southaven High School in Southaven, Mississippi.

College career
Byrum played for the Mississippi Valley State Delta Devils. He was teammates with Jerry Rice under coach Archie Cooley. Carl was inducted into the Mississippi Valley State University Athletic Hall of Fame in 2006.

Professional career
Byrum was selected by the Buffalo Bills of the NFL with the 111th pick in the 1986 NFL Draft. He played in 41 games, starting twelve, for the Bills from 1986 to 1988, rushing for 527 yards on 132 carries. He also caught 18 passes for 127 yards and one touchdown.

Personal life
Byrum  has spent time working as a welder and as a neighbor of Chris Nesterenko.

References

External links
Just Sports Stats

Living people
1963 births
American football running backs
African-American players of American football
Mississippi Valley State Delta Devils football players
Buffalo Bills players
Players of American football from Mississippi
People from Olive Branch, Mississippi
National Football League replacement players
21st-century African-American people
20th-century African-American sportspeople